Julie Ditty and Abigail Spears were the defending champions, but both players chose not to participate. 
Maria Abramović and Eva Hrdinová won the title by defeating Jamie Hampton and Ajla Tomljanović in the final 2–6, 6–2, [10–4].

Seeds

Draw

Draw

References
 Main Draw

Q Hotel and Spa Women's Pro Tennis Classic - Doubles